The Koombooloomba Dam is a concrete gravity dam with a controlled spillway across the Tully River, located west of  and south, southeast of  in Far North Queensland, Australia. Built for the purpose of hydroelectric power generation, the dam creates the reservoir, Lake Koombooloomba.

Location and features
The dam was constructed by the Queensland Government Co-ordinator-General's Department in 1960.

The dam and power generation facilities are owned and operated by Cleanco Queensland.

Hydroelectric power facilities
Built in 1957 and most recently upgraded in 2008, the underground Kareeya Hydro Power Station was the first hydroelectric power station constructed on the Tully River. An intake tower is located in the Tully Falls Weira regulating pond for the power stationwhich directs water down a tunnel to the turbines below Tully Falls.

The Koombooloomba Hydro Power Station is a dam release point situated on Koombooloomba Dam. Its location on Koombooloomba Dam in the UNESCO World Heritagelisted Wet Tropics area finally put into use infrastructure established when the dam was constructed in 1960.

See also

List of dams in Queensland

References

Koombooloomba, Lake
Buildings and structures in Far North Queensland
Dams completed in 1960
Dams in Queensland
Gravity dams
1960 establishments in Australia